Edward Makula (4 July 1930 – 15 January 1996) was a Polish glider pilot and engineer.

He won the 1963 World Gliding Championships in Junin (Argentina) in a SZD-19 Zefir 2 and established 7 world records.
In 1965, the  Fédération Aéronautique Internationale (FAI) awarded him the Lilienthal Gliding Medal.

Edward Makula was an uncle of the glider aerobatics champion Jerzy Makula.

References 

Glider pilots
Polish aviators
1930 births
1996 deaths
Lilienthal Gliding Medal recipients
Glider flight record holders
Polish aviation record holders